Apalpon may refer to:

Apalon, a village alongside the Zami River in Kyain Seikgyi Township, Kawkareik District, Karen State, south-eastern Myanmar.
Apalon, an American software development company owned by IAC (company).